The Currant Mountain Wilderness is a  wilderness area centered on Currant Mountain in the White Pine Range of Nye County and White Pine County, in the eastern section of the state of Nevada in the western United States.

The Currant Mountain Wilderness is bordered on the north by the White Pine Range Wilderness, on the east by the Red Mountain Wilderness, and is administered by the Humboldt-Toiyabe National Forest.  The nearest city is Ely, Nevada. Currant Mountain is a habitat for ancient Pinus longaeva - Great Basin Bristlecone Pines.

See also 
 List of wilderness areas in Nevada
 List of U.S. Wilderness Areas
 Wilderness Act

References

External links
 Currant Mountain Wilderness.  Humboldt-Toiyabe National Forest. U.S. Forest Service.
 National Atlas: Map of Humboldt-Toiyabe National Forest
 NevadaWilderness.org

Humboldt–Toiyabe National Forest
Protected areas of Nye County, Nevada
Wilderness areas of Nevada
Protected areas of White Pine County, Nevada
Protected areas established in 1989
1989 establishments in Nevada